Persatoean Kesebelasan Indonesia Tjianjoer (or abbreviated as Perkesit Cianjur) is an Indonesian football club based in Cianjur Regency, West Java that competes in Liga 3. Their home base is Badak Putih Stadium.

References

External links

Football clubs in Indonesia
Football clubs in West Java
Association football clubs established in 1953
1953 establishments in Indonesia